The Catholic Diocese of Honolulu is a Latin Church ecclesiastical territory or diocese of the Catholic Church that comprises the entire state of Hawaii and the unincorporated Hawaiian Islands.

The Diocese of Honolulu is a suffragan diocese in the ecclesiastical province of the metropolitan Archdiocese of San Francisco, which also includes the suffragan dioceses of Las Vegas, Oakland, Reno, Sacramento, Salt Lake City, San Jose, Santa Rosa and Stockton. The patrons of the Diocese of Honolulu is the Blessed Virgin Mary, under the title of Malia O Ka Malu or Our Lady Queen of Peace. Other saints venerable particularly in the Diocese of Honolulu are Saint Damien of Molokai, and Saint Marianne of Molokai.

The diocese is governed by the Bishop of Honolulu. His canonical seat or cathedra is located at the Cathedral Basilica of Our Lady of Peace. With his clergy, the bishop ministers to a culturally diverse population in the following languages: Hawaiian; English; Ilokano; Tagalog; Samoan; Tongan; Japanese; Korean; Spanish; and Vietnamese. It is one of the most diverse and one of the largest dioceses in the United States in terms of territorial area which spans statewide and includes unpopulated Hawaiian Islands.

Early history

Summary
Pope Gregory XVI had divided Oceania into two vicariates apostolic. The evangelization of the Vicariate Apostolic of Oriental Oceania (consisting of the prefectures apostolic of Tahiti, the Marquesas, and the Sandwich Islands) was entrusted in 1825 to the Picpus Fathers, then recently established by Pierre Coudrin. The Vicariate Apostolic of Occidental Oceania was likewise entrusted to the Society of Mary, Marianists and Marists, founded in 1836 at Lyon by Jean-Claude-Marie Colin.

Shortly after the disappearance at sea of the Vicar Apostolic of Oriental Oceania, Msgr. Rouchouze, and a company of missionaries on the Marie Joseph in 1843, the Vatican canonically erected from its territories the Vicariate Apostolic of the Sandwich Islands. Similar vicariates apostolic were created for Tahiti and the Marquesas. Blessed Pius IX changed its name in 1848 to the Vicariate Apostolic of the Hawaiian Islands. Venerable Pope Pius XII elevated the vicariate apostolic to the dignity of a diocese on January 25, 1941, as it remains today.

Missionaries

The first Catholic mission to the Kingdom of Hawaii was established by the creation of the Prefecture Apostolic of the Sandwich Islands by Pope Leo XII and the appointment of Alexis Bachelot as its first and only prefect, a member of the Congregation of the Sacred Hearts of Jesus and Mary, a religious institute called the Picpus Fathers, founded by Pierre Coudrin during the French Revolution. The first Picpus Fathers departed from Bordeaux aboard the La Comète on November 21, 1826, and stopped in Valparaíso in Chile on February 8, 1827. The Picpus Fathers resumed their trip on February 25. They entered port at Honolulu Harbor on July 7. Having originally been refused entry by Protestant advisors to the king, the Picpus Fathers did not disembark from their ship until July 9, the Feast of Our Lady of Peace. Among the first Picpus Fathers were Abraham Armand and Alexis Bachelot of France, as well as Patrick Short of the United Kingdom. They were joined by six lay brothers. It has been claimed that Fathers Armand, Bachelot and Short concelebrated the first Mass in the Hawaiian Islands on Bastille Day, July 14, 1827, in honor of their religious institute's French heritage, but this is untrue, and an anachronism: concelebration of masses was not practiced at the time, and since France was being ruled by the restored Bourbon monarchy, "Bastille Day" would certainly not be marked as a national holiday. They performed the first baptism on November 30.

The Picpus Fathers were quick to plunge into the Hawaiian society. They learned the local language, went into the Native Hawaiian community and began preaching to them. They distributed Hawaiian language Bibles and taught the lessons of Jesus from the gospels. Hundreds of Native Hawaiians chose to receive the sacraments of baptism, confirmation and Eucharist. Among the first converts were William Pitt Kalanimoku who was baptized aboard the French vessel L'Uranie by Abbe de Quelen which arrived in 1819, four months after the death of Kamehameha the Great. Also the royal governors of Oahu, Boki and Liliha. They would both become pivotal members of the Catholic underground.

Persecution

Christian missionaries were influential in shaping the modern society of the kingdom after the deaths of Kamehameha I and Kamehameha II. The missionaries, largely Congregationalists from New England, baptized the queen regent Kaahumanu and persuaded her to create religious policy favoring the suppression of the Catholic Church in Hawaii. Kamehameha III agreed and enacted its expulsion from the kingdom. Fathers Bachelot and Short were forcibly boarded onto the brig Waverly by the chiefs loyal to Kaahumanu and they left Honolulu Harbor on December 24, 1831. They landed off the coast of California and worked in the California Missions near the present-day City of Los Angeles.

Native Hawaiian converts of the Catholic Church claimed to have been imprisoned, beaten and tortured after the physical expulsion of their missionary priests. The persecution was prescribed, according to the Bishop Museum, by the Protestant ministers claiming that such treatment was ordained by God. Commodore John Downes of the United States Navy frigate  expressed American disappointment of the king's decision resulting in the brief end of physical harm for the converts.

In 1835, both the vicar apostolic (Rouchouze) and prefect apostolic (Bachelot) working from Valparaíso dispatched Columba Murphy, a religious brother from Ireland affiliated with the Picpus Fathers, to evaluate the situation in the Hawaiian Islands. While other Picpus Fathers were denied entry into the kingdom, the king permitted Murphy to disembark from his ship due to his investigative role and the fact that Murphy, a mere brother, could not minister the sacraments. On September 30, 1836, Arsenius Walsh, a Picpus Father, arrived in Honolulu to continue Murphy's work. Murphy had left earlier to report back to his superiors. The royal government refused Walsh's entry. However, the captain of the French Navy ship La Bonite persuaded the king to allow Walsh to stay. The royal government agreed to permit the Picpus Fathers to work freely in the Hawaiian Islands as long as they only attended to foreign Catholics, not Native Hawaiians.

On April 17, 1837, Fathers Bachelot and Short returned to Honolulu thinking the deal made with Father Walsh would apply to them. On April 30, the royal government forced them back onto their ship. The American and British Consuls compelled the king to allow Bachelot and Short to disembark. As a result, the captains of British Navy and French Navy vessels escorted Bachelot and Short into Honolulu. Short would leave the Hawaiian Islands again in October.

France, which claimed to be a defender of the Catholic Church, dispatched the French Navy frigate Artemise which sailed into Honolulu Harbor on July 10, 1839. Captain Cyrille Pierre Théodore Laplace was ordered by his government to:

Fearing an assault on his kingdom for the religious persecution, Kamehameha III issued the Edict of Toleration on June 17, 1839. A major disappointment for the Protestant ministers, Catholics became free to worship in the kingdom with the proclamation:

As an act of reconciliation, Kamehameha III donated land to the Catholic Church in Hawaii for the construction of their first permanent church.

Foundation

Shortly after the Laplace incident and the issuance of the Edict of Toleration, Msgr. Étienne Rouchouze, Vicar Apostolic of Oriental Oceania, moved to Honolulu from Valparaíso, Chile. The bishop disembarked from his ship at Honolulu Harbor in the company of three Picpus Fathers. One of them was the earlier exiled Louis Désiré Maigret. Their arrival officially signified the Catholic victory over persecution in the Hawaiian Islands and the beginning of a permanent Catholic Church in Hawaii.

The first permanent church broke ground on the memorial feast of Our Lady of Peace on July 9, 1840. Our Lady of Peace had been the patroness of the Congregation of the Sacred Hearts of Jesus and Mary since the turmoil of the French Revolution. Fathers Armand, Bachelot and Short had consecrated the Hawaiian Islands under the protection of Our Lady of Peace when they first arrived. During the groundbreaking Mass, 280 Native Hawaiian catechumens received baptism and confirmation. For the rest of the year, devotees harvested large blocks of coral off the southern coastline of Oahu to build what would become the Cathedral Basilica of Our Lady of Peace.

On the various neighbor islands, Bishop Rouchouze commissioned the construction of other permanent churches to serve as parish missions. They also started building makeshift schools to teach in the Catholic traditions of academia. A printing press was brought into Honolulu for the production of Catholic literature including missals and hymnals written in the Hawaiian language.

In January 1842, an excited Bishop Rouchouze, pleased with the success of his work, decided to sail back to the Paris home of the Congregation of the Sacred Hearts of Jesus and Mary in order to recruit more Picpus Fathers and religious brothers to serve in the growing Catholic Church in Hawaii. Tragically, Bishop Rouchouze was lost at sea during his voyage back to the Hawaiian Islands. His vicar general took charge of the Vicariate Apostolic of Oriental Oceania while a search party was dispatched. Years later, the search was officially ended and Bishop Rouchouze was declared deceased.

Sex abuse lawsuits
In April 2020, Bishop Silva announced during a Sunday mass that the Diocese of Honolulu was paying millions to settle prior sex abuse cases. Silva also acknowledged that the Diocese was still facing a large of number of sex abuse lawsuits as well.

Bishops

Vicar Apostolic of the Sandwich Islands
 Louis Desire Maigret, SS.CC. (1847–1848)

Vicars Apostolic of the Hawaiian Islands
 Louis Desire Maigret, SS.CC. (1848–1882)
 Herman Koeckemann, SS.CC. (1882–1892)
 Gulstan Ropert, SS.CC. (1892–1903)
 Libert H. Boeynaems, SS.CC. (1903–1926)
 Stephen Alencastre, SS.CC. (1926–1940)

Bishops of Honolulu
 James Joseph Sweeney (1941–1968)
 John Joseph Scanlan (1968–1981)
 Joseph Anthony Ferrario (1982–1993)
 Francis X. DiLorenzo (1994–2004), appointed Bishop of Richmond
 Clarence Richard Silva (2005–present)

Auxiliary Bishops
 John Joseph Scanlan (1954-1968), appointed Bishop here
 Joseph Anthony Ferrario (1978-1982), appointed Bishop here

Vicariate Apostolic
Through the period that began with the landing of Fathers Armand, Bachelot and Short to the proclamation of the Edict of Toleration and arrival of Bishop Rouchouze, the Hawaiian Islands were administered as a prefecture within the larger Vicariate Apostolic of Oriental Oceania. Created in 1833 by Pope Gregory XVI and governed from South America, its territories included the Marquesas and Tahiti. After the disappearance of Bishop Rouchouze, the three prefectures were elevated into independent vicariates apostolic. Each would be led by their own bishops.

Maigret

The Vicariate Apostolic of the Sandwich Islands was established and on July 11, 1847, Blessed Pius IX appointed Louis Desiré Maigret as the succeeding prelate to the late Msgr. Rouchouze. The new vicar apostolic was consecrated in Chile as the titular bishop of Arathia and quickly attended to the needs of the fledgling Catholic Church in Hawaii. The name of the see was changed in 1848 to the Vicariate Apostolic of the Hawaiian Islands. Msgr. Maigret completed the construction of the Cathedral Basilica of Our Lady of Peace. He also invited the Sisters of the Sacred Hearts of Jesus and Mary to open proper Catholic schools. The priests and religious brothers of the Society of Mary (Marianists) originating in France were invited to do the same. Msgr. Maigret died on June 11, 1882, and was buried in a crypt below the sanctuary of the cathedral he built and loved.

Koeckemann

Pope Leo XIII immediately elevated Bernard Hermann Koeckemann, a Picpus Father from Germany, as the second Vicar Apostolic of the Hawaiian Islands. He was consecrated as the titular bishop of Olba. During his episcopate, Msgr. Koeckemann saw a wave of new Catholics from the exponentially growing sugarcane plantation laborer population in the Hawaiian Islands. The Catholic Church in Hawaii embraced new parishioners from the Philippines, Poland, Portugal and Spain among others. There were so many devout Portuguese members that churches often had to include Masses in which the sermon (for the rest of the Mass would have been in Latin) was delivered in the Portuguese language.

Msgr. Koeckemann also saw the rise of leprosy cases throughout the kingdom. He oversaw the work of Saint Damien of Molokai and Saint Marianne Cope as they served the ailing lepers residing in an isolated colony on the Makanalua peninsula on the island of Molokai. Both would have causes for canonization opened for them by their respective religious institutes.

On February 22, 1892, Msgr. Koeckemann died and was buried at the Honolulu Catholic Cemetery.

Ropert

It took several months before Pope Leo XIII appointed someone to succeed Bishop Koeckemann. On June 3, 1892, the pope chose a Picpus Father from France, Gulstan Francis Ropert to become the third Vicar Apostolic of the Hawaiian Islands. He was consecrated as titular bishop of Panopolis. It was during his reign that the Kingdom of Hawaiʻi was embroiled in revolution. American businessmen plotted to overthrow the peaceably reigning Queen of Hawaiʻi. United States Marines marched towards ʻIolani Palace, a neighbor of the Cathedral Basilica of Our Lady of Peace, and arrested Queen Liliʻuokalani. A provisional government was proclaimed before a republic was established. Msgr. Ropert received pleas by his Native Hawaiian followers to defend Liliʻuokalani, being tried by a military court for treason against the newly created government. Unfortunately, there wasn't much Msgr. Ropert could do. He would become the sole bishop of a new Republic of Hawaiʻi.

Msgr. Ropert also was responsible for the spiritual needs of local families whose children were sent overseas to fight in the Spanish–American War. He also consoled Filipinos whose families were lost in the Philippine–American War. Later in his reign, the Hawaiian Islands became a territory of the United States, and he became the first bishop of the Territory of Hawaiʻi. Msgr. Ropert died on January 4, 1903, and was buried in Honolulu Catholic Cemetery.

Boeynaems

Again it would take several months before Pope Leo XIII appointed someone to succeed the episcopacy in the Hawaiian Islands. On April 8, 1903, the pope appointed a Picpus Father from Antwerp in Belgium, Libert Hubert John Louis Boeynaems to become the fourth Vicar Apostolic of the Hawaiian Islands. He was consecrated titular bishop of Zeugma. During his reign, Msgr. Boeynaems observed many of his faithful being sent to fight in Europe during World War I. He also oversaw the increasing militarization of the Hawaiian Islands. The entire coastline of the island of Oahu was fortified and several United States military bases were established, including: Fort Shafter, Pearl Harbor and Schofield Barracks. With the absence of an established military ordinariate in the United States, Msgr. Boeynaems ministered to Catholic service members. After a period of illness, Msgr. Boeynaems died on May 13, 1926, and was buried in Honolulu Catholic Cemetery.

Alencastre

When Msgr. Boeynaems became ill, Pope Pius XI elevated the first person to have grown up in the Hawaiian Islands to become a vicar apostolic. The pope appointed Stephen Peter Alencastre, a Picpus Father born in Portugal who was brought as an infant to the Hawaiian Islands with his family to live. Msgr. Alencastre was raised and educated in Hawaii, living on the various islands. He subsequently graduated from Saint Louis College and was accepted into the Congregation of the Sacred Hearts. He was ordained to the priesthood and educated in Europe by the Picpus Fathers, earning a doctorate in sacred theology. He was later appointed and consecrated as coadjutor vicar apostolic and titular bishop of Arabissus to assist the ailing Msgr. Boeynaems, who was suffering in a hospital. Upon Msgr. Boeynaems' death, Msgr. Alencastre succeeded as the fifth and final Vicar Apostolic of the Hawaiian Islands. Seeing a need for new locally trained priests, Msgr. Alencastre established Saint Stephen's Seminary in Kalihi Valley, named after his personal patron saint. He also oversaw the renovation of the Cathedral Basilica of Our Lady of Peace, modernizing it in time for the centennial celebration of the Catholic Church in Hawaii in 1927. He died aboard a ship en route from Los Angeles on November 9, 1940.

Diocese
Msgr. Alencastre's premonition that the vicariate would be elevated to diocesan status was fulfilled earlier than expected. Upon his death, Venerable Pius XII decided that the Hawaiian Islands was no longer a missionary church. Rather, its flourishing Catholic community was mature enough to be administered as a fully independent body of its own. The pope canonically erected the new Diocese of Honolulu on January 25, 1941.

Sweeney

After several months of consideration, the Pope looked outside of the Congregation of the Sacred Hearts of Jesus and Mary for a successor to the last vicar apostolic. Pope Pius XII appointed a diocesan priest of the Archdiocese of San Francisco, James Joseph Sweeney, as the first Bishop of Honolulu on May 20, 1941; Msgr. Sweeney was subsequently ordained to the episcopate on July 25, 1941, in the Cathedral of Saint Mary of Assumption in San Francisco, California.

Soon after Bishop Sweeney's installation, on December 7, 1941, came the bombing of Pearl Harbor by Japanese forces. Thousands of military and civilians died. Explosions were heard around downtown Honolulu and near the Cathedral Basilica of Our Lady of Peace. Bishop Sweeney shepherded the diocese throughout World War II.

Blessed John XXIII opened the Second Vatican Council on October 11, 1962, and Bishop Sweeney was a council father, one of many prelates from the United States to attend the sessions. Inspired by the reforms agreed upon in Rome, he enacted major changes to the liturgy in the Diocese of Honolulu. One of his actions was to renovate the Cathedral Basilica of Our Lady of Peace in keeping with the newly promulgated Constitution on the Sacred Liturgy. Soon all parishes offered Mass primarily in the vernacular in place of Latin and altars were built facing the congregation instead of the sanctuary wall. Slowly, other languages were incorporated into the Mass including the Hawaiian language. Bishop Sweeney also invited the Marist Fathers and Brothers to staff several parishes on the islands of Oahu and Kauai.

Bishop Sweeney fell ill and could not perform his duties with full vigor. His request for an auxiliary bishop was granted. He died on his birthday on June 19, 1968, at the age of 70. He was buried in Colma near San Francisco, where he spent his early years as a priest.

Scanlan

Pope Paul VI appointed John Joseph Scanlan, the diocese's auxiliary bishop and apostolic administrator as its second ordinary on March 6, 1968. A San Francisco archdiocesan priest from County Cork in Ireland, Msgr. Scanlan witnessed the growth of Hawaii, that had passed from a territory to a state of the United States on 1959. He maintained cordial relations with the Catholic Governor of Hawaii, John A. Burns, even when the Hawaii legislature passed a bill permitting abortion on demand and Governor Burns allowed the bill to become law without his signature. Scanlan was also remembered for his invitation of several religious institutes to establish themselves in the Hawaiian Islands. Among such groups were the Society of Jesus, the Christian Brothers of Ireland, the Religious of the Virgin Mary, and the Dominican Sisters of Iloilo. The Jesuits primarily minister to the students of the University of Hawaii at Mānoa.

In 1977, Msgr. Scanlan served as the principal consecrator of Father Joseph Ferrario as auxiliary bishop. His age was beginning to affect his work. Feeling the pressures of being 75 years old, Msgr. Scanlan chose to retire on June 30, 1981. He died on January 31, 1997, at Nazareth House in San Rafael, a retirement home for priests and religious. His funeral was held at the metropolitan Cathedral of Saint Mary of the Assumption and later at the Cathedral Basilica of Our Lady of Peace in Honolulu. Bishop Scanlan, a father of the Second Vatican Ecumenical Council, had the honor of being buried beside Bishop Maigret, a father of the First Vatican Ecumenical Council, in a crypt under the sanctuary of the Cathedral Basilica of Our Lady of Peace.

Ferrario

Pope John Paul II appointed the diocese's auxiliary bishop Joseph Anthony Ferrario, a former Sulpican educator and diocesan priest, as the third Bishop of Honolulu on May 13, 1982.

DiLorenzo

Upon Msgr. Ferrario's announcement of his retirement, the Vatican had appointed Msgr. Francis DiLorenzo, auxiliary bishop of Scranton as Apostolic Administrator of Honolulu. Later, on November 29, 1994, Pope John Paul II, appointed Msgr. DiLorenzo as the fourth Bishop of Honolulu. The Vatican later appointed Msgr. DiLorenzo as ordinary of the See of Richmond upon the announcement of the retirement of Richmond bishop Walter Francis Sullivan. Msgr. DiLorenzo assumed leadership of the Diocese of Richmond upon installation on May 24, 2004.

With the departure of Msgr. DiLorenzo, the diocesan college of consultors in accordance with the 1983 Code of Canon Law, on May 28, 2004, elected from their peers Father Thomas L. Gross as temporary diocesan administrator. He also served on the committee that screened candidates for the post of Bishop of Honolulu. On February 1, 2006, Father Marc R. Alexander became diocesan administrator.

Silva

Pope Benedict XVI appointed Clarence Richard Silva, the first native-born person in the episcopacy of the Hawaiian Islands to become Bishop of Honolulu on May 17, 2005. He also became the second person of Portuguese ancestry in the episcopate, along with the Msgr. Stephen Peter Alencastre, SS.CC. Formerly the Vicar General of the Diocese of Oakland, Silva was ordained to the episcopate and installed as bishop at the Neal S. Blaisdell Center Arena on July 21. Over 3,500 were in attendance, making it one of the largest events held by the Diocese of Honolulu in its history.

The principal consecrator was William Joseph Levada, Archbishop of San Francisco and newly appointed Prefect of the Congregation for the Doctrine of the Faith. The ordination and installation ceremony was the last official ceremonial function as metropolitan bishop over the Province of San Francisco for Levada; other non-ceremonial functions would continue until his official departure from office. Also in attendance were Gabriel Montalvo Higuera, Archbishop Apostolic Nuncio to the United States, and Anthony Apuron, Archbishop of Agana as well as personal friend Deacon Larry Sousa of Norman, Oklahoma. Although scheduled to attend the episcopal ordination, Roger Mahony, Cardinal Archbishop of Los Angeles, was unable to be present due to unforeseen airplane problems at Los Angeles International Airport.

Special anniversaries of significance to the diocese

January 23 – Memorial, Saint Marianne Cope, religious (2005)
January 25 – Anniversary of the Canonical Erection by Pope Pius XII of the Catholic Diocese of Honolulu (1941)
May 10 – Memorial, Saint Damien of Molokai, religious (1995)
May 17 – Anniversary of the Appointment of Clarence Richard Silva, Vicar General of the Diocese of Oakland, as Fifth Bishop of Honolulu (2005)
July 9 – Memorial, Blessed Virgin Mary under the Title, Queen of Peace
July 21 – Anniversary of the Ordination to the Episcopate and Installation of Clarence Richard Silva as Fifth Bishop of Honolulu (2005)
July 28 – Anniversary of Dedication of the Co-Cathedral of Saint Theresa of the Child Jesus, Honolulu (1985)
August 15 – Anniversary of Dedication of the Cathedral Basilica of Our Lady, Queen of Peace, Honolulu (1843)

Parishes
See, List of parishes of the Roman Catholic Diocese of Honolulu.

Notable people

Saints, Blesseds, and Servants of God
Though the Diocese of Honolulu may be small, a number of Catholics have found their way to holiness and these include:
 Jozef de Veuster (Damian of Molokai) (1840–1889), Professed Priest of the Congregation of the Sacred Hearts of Jesus and Mary (Picpus)
 Barbara Cope (Marianne) (1838–1918), Professed Religious of the Franciscan Sisters of Syracuse 
 Ira Barnes Dutton (Joseph) (1843–1931), Layperson of the Diocese of Honolulu; Member of the Secular Franciscans

Other notable parishioners
 Helio Koa'eloa (ca. 1815–1846), Married Layperson of the Diocese of Honolulu 
 Gulstan-Francois Ropert (1839–1903), Professed Priest of the Congregation of the Sacred Hearts of Jesus and Mary (Picpus); Apostolic Vicar of the Hawaiian Islands; Titular Bishop of Panopolis 
 Ambrose Kanoealu'i Hutchison (ca. 1856–1932), Married Layperson of the Diocese of Honolulu 
 Leopoldina Burns (Maria Leopoldina) (1855–1942), Professed Religious of the Franciscan Sisters of Syracuse
 Aloysius Schmitt (1909–1944), Priest of the Archdiocese of Dubuque

High schools
 Damien Memorial School, Honolulu
 Maryknoll School, Honolulu
 Sacred Hearts Academy, Honolulu
 Saint Louis School, Honolulu
 St. Anthony High School, Wailuku
 St. Joseph High School, Hilo
 St. Michael High School, Waialua

Closed schools
Saint Francis School, Honolulu

Arms

See also

 Catholic Church by country
 Catholic Church hierarchy
 Catholic Church in the United States
 Eastern Catholic Community in Hawaii
 Ecclesiastical Province of San Francisco
 Episcopal Diocese of Hawaii
 Global organisation of the Catholic Church
Hawaii Catholic Herald
Hawaii Reformed Catholic Church
 Historical list of the Catholic bishops of the United States
 List of Catholic bishops of the United States
 List of missionaries to Hawaii
 List of Roman Catholic archdioceses (by country and continent)
 List of Roman Catholic dioceses (alphabetical) (including archdioceses)
 List of Roman Catholic dioceses (structured view) (including archdioceses)
 List of the Roman Catholic bishops of Honolulu
 List of the Roman Catholic bishops of the United States
 List of the Roman Catholic cathedrals of the United States
 List of the Roman Catholic dioceses of the United States
 Lists of patriarchs, archbishops, and bishops

References

External links
Roman Catholic Diocese of Honolulu Official Site
Roman Catholic Archdiocese of San Francisco
Cathedral Basilica of Our Lady of Peace 
French in Hawaii by Hawaii History
Life in Hawaii by Titus Coan
Catholic Missions in the 19th and 20th Century (in French)

 
Christian organizations established in 1941
Honolulu
Honolulu
1941 establishments in Hawaii
1843 establishments in Hawaii